The Prime Minister's Appointments Secretary is a British civil servant who leads the appointment of a various senior public figures on behalf of the Prime Minister of the United Kingdom, from Regius Professors to Church of England bishops to Lord Lieutenants. For ecclesiastical appointments, they sit on the Crown Nominations Commission.

List of Prime Minister's Appointments Secretaries

 1961–1972: Sir John Hewitt KCVO CB
 1974–1982: Colin Peterson
 1982–1993: Sir Robin Catford KCVO
 1993–1999: John Holroyd CB CVO
 1999–2008: William Chapman CVO
 2008–2014: Sir Paul Britton CB CVO
 2011–2020: Richard Tilbrook (senior state appointments; assumed full role in 2020)
 2014–2019: Edward Chaplin CMG OBE (senior ecclesiastical appointments)
 2020–2022: Richard Tilbrook CVO
 2022–present: Jonathan Hellewell LVO

References

Government of the United Kingdom
British Prime Minister's Office